Millicent Preston-Stanley (9 September 1883 – 23 June 1955) was an Australian feminist and politician who served as the first female member of the New South Wales Legislative Assembly. In 1925, she became the second woman to enter government in Australia. She was also among the first women in New South Wales to become Justices of the Peace and served as president of the Women Justices Association from 1923 to 1926. Throughout her life, Preston-Stanley advocated for women's rights, health reform, and temperance.

In 1925, Preston-Stanley became the first female member of the New South Wales Legislative Assembly, representing the Eastern Suburbs as a member of the Nationalist Party, one of the historic predecessor parties to today's Liberal Party. After a failed bid in the 1921 election, she picked the seat up in May 1925, which she held until September 1927.

Personal life 
Millicent Fanny Stanley was born in Sydney in 1883. She was the daughter of Augustine Stanley, a greengrocer, and his wife Frances (née Preston). After her father deserted the family, her mother obtained a divorce and reverted to her birth name, which Millicent Fanny also adopted. 

Preston-Stanley married Crawford Vaughan, former Premier of South Australia, in 1934. She died on 23 June 1955 in the Sydney suburb of Randwick from cerebrovascular disease.

Political career 
Preston-Stanley served as the member for the Eastern Suburbs from 1925 to 1927, campaigning for reductions in maternal mortality, reform in child welfare, amendments to the Health Act, and better housing. She delivered her inaugural address to the Legislative Assembly of the New South Wales Parliament on 26 August 1925, using the opportunity to address her colleagues who did not believe that women had a role in politics. She said: Some hon. members have been kind enough to suggest that women should be protected from the hurly-burly of politics. This attitude of mind may do credit to the softness of their hearts, and I think it may also be taken as prima facie evidence of a little softening in their heads. … I believe that women's questions are national questions, and that national questions are women's questions, and it may be shown that woman can take her place amongst the representatives of the people in the Parliament of the country and play her part in the political life of the nation.In addition, her inaugural address argued against reducing the 48 hour workweek to 44 hours, arguing that the Labour Party should first shorten the average woman's workweek, which she claimed was 112 hours.

Preston-Stanley was actively involved in women's groups such as the Women's Liberal League. She served as the president of the Feminist Club of New South Wales from 1919 to 1934 and from 1952 until her death in 1955. The club was amongst the organisations that successfully lobbied for the introduction of the Women's Legal Status Act 1918, which allowed women to run for office in the Lower House and local government, and to become Justices of the Peace. Millicent was one of the first women in New South Wales to be appointed a Justice of the Peace. She was commissioned as a Justice of the Peace in 1921 and was President of the Women's Justices' Association from 1923 to 1926.

A fervent supporter of the United Australia Party (UAP) — a precursor to the Liberal Party — Millicent Preston-Stanley brought the club to prominence in the 1930s. Under her leadership the club stood apart from many other women's organisations that existed in the period in that the latter — like the Australian Women's Guild of Empire — concerned themselves with matters revolving around home keeping, family, and religiosity. Their purpose was primarily evangelical, and social, helping to cultivate resources and gatherings for women to attend and exchange information and skills in craftwork like sewing, knitting and so forth. It was precisely the entrenched notion that politics did not form part of "women's concerns" that the feminist movement of the 1930s was sought to dislodge, and it was this apolitical focus that distinguished the women's organisations of the period from the Feminist Club of New South Wales. The Feminist Club's objective was "to secure equality of liberty, status and opportunity in all spheres between men and women.’

In parliament she campaigned on the issues of women's mortality in childbirth, child welfare, institutional care for the mentally ill, and custody rights in divorce. She also lobbied for the rights of mothers to custody of their children, family planning and sex education, a focus on maternal and child health, and for a chair of obstetrics at the medical school, sarcastically calling for "'Horses' rights for women" after the University of Sydney instead established a course in veterinary obstetrics.

She personally took up the cause of actress Emélie Polini, who failed to regain custody of her daughter Patricia when she returned to her native England. Though her private member's bill on equal custody rights failed she continued the campaign. She wrote a play Whose Child? based on this case.

She left parliament in 1927 after an electoral redistribution of the newly created seat of Bondi saw her defeated at the polls.

Notes

References

1883 births
1955 deaths
Australian feminists
Members of the New South Wales Legislative Assembly
Nationalist Party of Australia members of the Parliament of New South Wales
20th-century Australian politicians
20th-century Australian women politicians
Women members of the New South Wales Legislative Assembly
Neurological disease deaths in New South Wales
Deaths from cerebrovascular disease